The 2006 Winter Paralympic Games, the ninth Paralympic Winter Games, took place in Turin, Italy from 10 to 19 March 2006.  These were the first Winter Paralympic Games to be held in Italy. They were also the first Paralympics to use the new Paralympics logo.

Italy will host the Winter Paralympics again in 2026, scheduled to be held in Milan and Cortina d'Ampezzo.

Medal count

The top 10 NPCs by number of gold medals are listed below. The host nation (Italy) is highlighted.

Sports
The Games featured 58 medal events in five disciplines of four sports. As with other Paralympic Games, medals are awarded for each classification within each event. The sport of wheelchair curling made its Paralympic debut at these games.

 
 
 Nordic skiing

Venues
The sport venues were also used during the Winter Olympics, although not all Olympic venues were in use for the Paralympics.

Opening ceremonies was held at Stadio Olimpico Grande Torino and the closing and awarding ceremonies were held at the Piaza Castello.

Alpine skiing events were held at Sestriere.
Cross-country skiing and
biathlon events were held shared by the Cesana San Sicario complex. All skiing athletes were accommodated in the Mountain Paralympic Village in Sestriere.

Ice sledge hockey was held in Torino Esposizioni and wheelchair curling was held in Pinerolo Palaghiaccio. These athletes were accommodated in the City Paralympic Village in Turin.

Calendar

|-
|bgcolor=#00cc33|   ●   ||Opening ceremony|| bgcolor=#3399ff|   ●   ||Event competitions || bgcolor=#ffcc00|   ●   ||Event finals||bgcolor=#ee3333|   ●   ||Closing ceremony
|-

|-
! March
! 10th
! 11th
! 12th
! 13th
! 14th
! 15th
! 16th
! 17th
! 18th
! 19th
|-
|Ceremonies
|bgcolor=#00cc33 align=center|   ●   
| 
| 
| 
| 
| 
| 
| 
| 
|bgcolor=#ee3333 align=center|   ●   
|-
|Alpine Skiing
| 
|bgcolor=#ffcc00|   2   
|bgcolor=#ffcc00|   4   
|bgcolor=#ffcc00|   2   
|bgcolor=#ffcc00|   4   
| 
|bgcolor=#ffcc00|   2   
|bgcolor=#ffcc00|   4   
|bgcolor=#ffcc00|   2   
|bgcolor=#ffcc00|   4   
|-
|Biathlon
| 
|bgcolor=#ffcc00|   6   
| 
| 
|bgcolor=#ffcc00|   6   
| 
| 
| 
| 
| 
|-
|Cross-country skiing
| 
| 
|bgcolor=#ffcc00|   6   
| 
| 
|bgcolor=#ffcc00|   6   
| 
|bgcolor=#ffcc00|   2   
|bgcolor=#ffcc00|   2   
|bgcolor=#ffcc00|   4   
|-
|Ice sledge hockey
| 
|bgcolor=#3399ff|   ●   
|bgcolor=#3399ff|   ●   
| 
|bgcolor=#3399ff|   ●   
|bgcolor=#3399ff|   ●   
|bgcolor=#3399ff|   ●   
|bgcolor=#3399ff|   ●   
|bgcolor=#ffcc00|   1   
| 
|-
|Wheelchair curling
| 
| 
|bgcolor=#3399ff|   ●   
|bgcolor=#3399ff|   ●   
|bgcolor=#3399ff|   ●   
|bgcolor=#3399ff|   ●   
|bgcolor=#3399ff|   ●   
|bgcolor=#3399ff|   ●   
|bgcolor=#ffcc00|   1   
| 
|-

Participants
Thirty-nine National Paralympic Committees (NPCs) entered athletes at the 2006 Winter Paralympics. This was an increase of three from the 36 represented at the 2002 Winter Paralympics. The number in parentheses indicates the number of participants from each NPC.

Note that, although Greece was scheduled to compete, no Greek athlete took part in any event; the International Paralympic Committee does not list Greece as having entered any athlete in the Games, and considers that there were thirty-eight NPCs at the Games, rather than thirty-nine.

 (2)
 (2)
 (10)
 (25)
 (6)
 (1)
 (3)
 (35)
 (2)
 (8)
 (1)
 (5)
 (6)
 (7)
 (19)
 (35)
 (20)
 (1)
 (2)
 (1)
 (39)  (Host)
 (40)
 (2)
 (3)
 (1)
 (1)
 (1)
 (2)
 (29)
 (11)
 (29)
 (17)
 (1)
 (1)
 (9)
 (19)
 (21)
 (12)
 (56)

A total of 486 athletes participated in the Games, 385 male and 101 female. This is an increase from the 430 athletes participated in 2002. Despite overall increase of delegates and athletes, the following nations who participated in the 2002 Winter Paralympics did not send athletes to Turin.

Mexico was the only country who had sent an athlete to the Winter Paralympics but not the Olympics.

Other information
These are the second Paralympic Games to be held in Italy, which hosted the first Summer Paralympics in Rome in 1960.

These are the first Paralympic Games to feature a live webcast of events, hosted by ParalympicSport.TV.

The Games mascot is Aster, a star-shaped snowflake similar in design and was the younger brother to the Olympic mascots Neve and Gliz.

Unable to fund the hosting themselves, the Olympic organizing committee TOROC sold the rights off to a company for an estimated US$40 million

See also

2006 Winter Olympics

References

External links
Official website of Torino Paralympics 2006 → Archive copy at the Wayback Machine
Torino 2006 Paralympic Games (English) → Archive copy at the Wayback Machine
ParalympicSport.TV
International Paralympic Committee

 
Paralympics
Winter Paralympic Games
2006 in multi-sport events
2006 in Italian sport
Sports competitions in Turin
Multi-sport events in Italy
March 2006 sports events in Europe
Winter sports competitions in Italy
2000s in Turin